The sixteenth season of So You Think You Can Dance (SYTYCD), an American dance competition reality show on FOX, returned on June 3, 2019. The series has won numerous awards since its debut in 2005, including eleven Emmy Awards for Outstanding Choreography, the most for any show. This panel of judges again features series creator Nigel Lythgoe, as well as the return of ballroom dance champion and expert Mary Murphy. New to the panel are choreographer Laurieann Gibson and B-boy dancer/choreographer Dominic "D-Trix" Sandoval, who serve as the third and fourth judges during auditions and live shows. Cat Deeley continues in her role as host for a fifteenth consecutive season, for which she has earned five Emmy Award nominations. The grand prize is $250,000, a cover article in Dance Spirit, and the title of "America's Favorite Dancer".

In the first five episodes, the Judges' Auditions featured about six full performances each along with the judges' critiques, as well as montages of other dancers. From those auditions, a pool of eighty-three contestants, who each earned a Golden Ticket advancing them to The Academy where they face, in the next episodes, six Academy Rounds that winnow down to the Top Ten—five women and five men—for the live shows.

In episode ten, and for the rest of the season, the live Studio Performance Shows showcase the finalists in solos, duets, and group numbers, as they vie to connect with viewers who vote for their favorites. The following week, at the end of the show, the two women and two men with the lowest vote totals will be up for elimination. The judges decide which woman and man will be cut.

On September 16, 2019, Bailey Muñoz was crowned "America's Favorite Dancer" and became the first b-boy to win the title in the show's history. A forty-stop tour featuring the Top Ten contestants and two All-stars started soon after the finale and ran until December 2019.

Judges' Auditions
Madison Jordan, an eventual Top Six contestants, shared that she submitted her online video in January and was contacted a month later to in-person auditions. Those auditions, for dancers ages eighteen to thirty, took place with producers in: New York on February 9, 2019; Dallas on February 12; and Los Angeles on February 23. From these, approximately 130 dancers were chosen by the producers to audition in Hollywood in March before the panel of judges.

In addition to the new judges, the televised auditions have been revamped so instead of remote tryouts, the contestants come to the new SYTYCD Hollywood studio, outfitted with 120 cameras surrounding the stage, allowing the movement to be "frozen" in time, like bullet time. Another change is the addition of a studio audience instead of being just the rest of auditioners and their supporters.

The five episodes of Judges' Auditions each featured about six full-length dance routines; with an introduction package about the contestant, critique, and vote from the judging panel. Only a few of those were excluded from moving to The Academy Rounds; the successful auditioners were given a "Golden Ticket" to the Academy. In addition, montages of auditions were also mixed in with the full ones, showing a mix of some voted through.

Some of the episodes were also themed; episode four featured various couple configurations including identical twin eighteen-year-old contemporary dancers Trent and Colton Edwards.

The Academy
The Academy Rounds, filmed in April, started in episode six at the Dolby Theatre in Hollywood, California with the eighty-three contestants who made it through the Judges’ Auditions to get a Golden Ticket by excelling in a dance style of their choice. Over three days they will go through four Choreography Rounds of The Academy; rehearsing new dance routines, from a professional choreographer, en masse for ninety minutes.

They then face the original four judges, in small groups, who can: pass them through; have them “dance for their lives”; or be cut from the competition. Of those that started: approximately only one in four, or twenty (ten women, and ten men) will make it to the Top Twenty; and they will face The Final Cut, with only half (five women, and five men) going through to the Top Ten studio performance shows.

Choreography Rounds
The four Choreography Rounds were:

 Hip-hop dance taught by Luther Brown: he was looking for the dancers to have precision in the moves, energy, and star quality. They performed to the dancehall song “Boasty” by rappers Wiley and Stefflon Don with Jamaican singer Sean Paul featuring Idris Elba;
Ballroom dance taught by Emma Slater, and Sasha Farber: they taught a “sassy, intricate” cha-cha-cha with “lots of tricks” to the song “Free, Free, Free” by Pitbull featuring Theron Theron. The choreographers looked for fun, and a noticeable “connection with [the] partner”;
Contemporary dance taught by Talia Favia: she taught her “fast, and challenging” routine that is “athletic, but with an emotional part [one] must feel”. It's performed to “Moments Passed” by Dermot Kennedy.
The Group Round with Mandy Moore, assisted by All-Star Robert Roldan from season 7: Moore, for a first in the show's history, reworked the three previous rounds’ choreography into a new group number; to a different song, a breakdown remix of “Dance to the Music” by Sly and the Family Stone. Moore looks for the same quality needed to compete in the Studio Shows, the ability to “push” even when injured, exhausted, or mentally drained.

The Academy's first three rounds were shown in episode six. Day One started with the Hip-hop Round, after which ten of the eighty-three dancers who started are cut, including Trent, one of the identical twins. Day Two, the Ballroom Round cuts another fifteen people including: Colton, the other identical twin; and Sarah “Smac” McCreanor, a jazz dancer who wowed the judges as a comedic performer, but whose dancing was not at a high enough standard for the season.

Episode seven picks up in the middle of the Contemporary Round, where fifty-four dancers faced more cuts: including Jay Jackson, a contemporary dancer, and drag queen, who competed in drag last year but opted not to this time; and Jarrod Tyler Paulson, who is in a romantic relationship with fellow contestant Madison Jordan, who advanced to the Top Twenty. Day Three sees the forty-three remaining dancers take on The Group Round: the judges do their cuts by seeing the contestants grouped by their dance genres; eleven are cut, leaving thirty-three.

The Final Cuts 
The Academy Week finishes with the last two Academy Rounds: The Solo Round features each of the remaining thirty-three contestants dancing a solo in their own genre, thirteen are cut, and the Top Twenty are revealed; while The Final Cut pares the dancers down to ten contestants.

In episode eight and nine, we will see The Final Cut coverage. Each contestant will be paired with a SYTYCD All-Star, and choreographer, to rehearse a duet outside the contestant's genre. In episode eight the Top Ten girls compete, the Top Ten boys compete the following week in episode nine. The five contestants going through will be announced each night.

Top Ten Girls 
In order of appearance in episode eight:

Top Ten Boys 
In order of appearance in episode nine:

Top Ten contestants
The Top Ten contestants are:

 Benjamin Castro: 18, from Miami, Florida, is a contemporary dancer. He was born in Chile, and immigrated when he was two. He has been dancing since he was five, and is close to his large extended family: his cousin Ruby was on season 13; he trained with his uncle Manny, who along with his wife Lory, are “owners, directors, teachers and choreographers” of Dancetown studio.
 Gino Cosculluela: 18, from Miami, Florida, is a contemporary dancer. His older brother and sister are both professional dancers. He's been dancing since he was very young, first tagging along to his sister's classes before being enrolled in a hip hop class. In 2012 he and his siblings appeared on season 7 of America's Got Talent as the dance trio "The Cos Fam," they were eliminated before the Live Shows. In 2013-2014 he was a recurring dancer on seasons 3, and 4 of Dance Moms; he made a guest appearance in 2016 on season 6. After the SYTYCD tour he is dancing on Broadway in a revival of West Side Story opening in December 2019.
 Eddie Hoyt: 19, from Buscawen, New Hampshire, is an Irish-American tap dancer. He was homeschooled and had few friends as a child. His first dance was a highland dance when he was seven. During his freshman year of homeschooling, he came out as gay, which was a difficult experience for him having grown up in a religious family. He had previously auditioned for Season 15, but in the end, was cut just before the top twenty were chosen. He moved to Utah to train, and become the tap director at Center Stage Performing Arts Studio in Orem.
 Madison Jordan: 21, from Lake Elmo, Minnesota, is a contemporary dancer. She has alopecia which has toughened her; the disease made her hair fall out when she was seven, and she dealt with bullying because of that. She wore wigs up until 2017 when she opted to forego them. She trained at Larkin Dance Studio (LDS) in Maplewood, Minnesota, which has a reputation for training dancers with careers on Broadway and in Hollywood. She trained at LDS for fifteen years—starting when she was three, and until she graduated high school—and it is where she met her boyfriend Jarrod Paulson. She went to college at the University of Minnesota where she was a cheerleader. She danced with Crash Dance Productions (CDP), a Twin Cities contemporary dance company. She reconnected with Paulson at CPD and he also competed this season but was cut during the Academy rounds.
 Anna Linstruth: 19, from Las Vegas, Nevada, is a hip hop dancer. She was born and raised in Lancaster, California, where she helped raise horses. She took up hip hop dancing after she moved, and now teaches the genre.
 Bailey ‘Bailrok’ Muñoz: 18, is Filipino-American from Las Vegas, Nevada and is a B-boy dancer. He was born in the San Francisco Bay Area, several months prematurely—weighing four pounds and four ounces—and dealt with severe health issues for seven years because of the condition. In first grade he discovered his love for performing. In 2010, at age nine, he was a semi-finalist in the dance duo Future FunK on America's Got Talent. He has toured as a dancer with: Justin Bieber's "Purpose Tour"; Macy's Passport with Robin Thicke, and CeeLo Green; Bruno Mars; Beyonce; and with Meghan Trainor. He was the youngest members of the Rock Steady Crew when he joined. He performs on the Las Vegas strip at Rose.Rabbit.Lie. joining the ensemble just after middle school; his smaller stature helps him as he dances atop a grand piano. Up to competing on SYTYCD he had not had a female dancing partner. He has attended Las Vegas Academy of the Arts, and is on break from University of Nevada, Las Vegas.
 Sophie Pittman: 18, from Collierville, Tennessee, is a contemporary dancer. She's been dancing since she was three, and trained at Studio 413. She has three younger siblings, and graduated high school in May 2019. Her father is a physical therapist who helped her learn to “stretch, recover and monitor her nutrition.”
 Mariah Russell: 19, from Nashville, Tennessee, is a contemporary dancer. She first started classes at age seven, and in dance competitions when she was nine. She's trained at Creswell Middle School of the Arts, Nashville School of the Arts, and DC Dance Factory in Franklin which as of September 2019, has had six students go on to be SYTYCD finalists. She grew up in a single-parent family but her mom is now engaged to be married; her fiancé also supports Mariah's dance career.
 Ezra Sosa: 18, from Provo, Utah, is a ballroom dancer. He comes from a dancing family including his sister, a fellow finalist.
 Stephanie Sosa: 19, from Salt Lake City, Utah, is a ballroom dancer. She made it to the top twenty in 2018, but was cut before the Top Ten. She said this last year has been difficult as her mom had a stroke. She's appearing in High School Musical: The Musical: The Series on Disney+ starting in November 2019.

Female contestants

Male contestants

Elimination chart

Contestants are listed in chronological order of elimination.

Studio shows 
The Academy Rounds took place in April, the contestants had a few months off to practice as the live shows did not begin filming until August. The rest of the season consists of the live shows—taped in front of a live audience on Saturdays, then aired the following Monday; with the exception of the finale, which was broadcast live—eliminating finalists based on viewer votes to determine "America's favorite dancer". Finalist Sophie Pittman shared the experience can be "kind of nerve-racking because we don't know what to expect". According to Barbara Muñoz, mother of another finalist, Bailey, contestants "draw from a hat what genre and choreographer they're paired with". The dancers are in rehearsal Tuesday through Saturday, "more than eight hours a day with professional choreographers", with new styles each week and usually one or more partners.

Top Ten Perform: Round 1 (August 12, 2019)
 Group Routine: Top 10: "This Is Me" — Kesha (Contemporary; Choreographer: Mandy Moore)

Top Ten Perform: Round 2 (August 19, 2019)

 Group Routine: Top 10: "Sign of the Times" — Harry Styles (Contemporary; Choreographer: Travis Wall)

Top Eight
The Top Eight show marks a format change to a two-hour show. Each contestant will dance five times: a solo; two duets; and two group numbers including the opening; before the elimination at the end.

Top Eight group number:

Choreographed by Jonathan and Oksana Platero, the number is a mash-up of Latin/Rhythm dances to "Himno del Carnaval", by District 78 featuring Agina. Afterwards host Cat Deeley alluded to this episode going "around the world", with later numbers presenting dance styles from Africa, Polynesia, and South America. Dance Spirit Alison Feller noted the series has gone "above and beyond" to "bring worldly dance forms to the small screen".

Solos performed in their own style

Top Six
The Top Six sees the introduction of the All-stars (AS) into the opening group number, and as duet partners for the first round. Choreographer Mandy Moore noted that using the AS forces the finalists to quickly develop a connection with a new partner. Each finalist will perform: a solo; two duets, one with an AS, and one with their finalist partner; and two group numbers, the opening number, and a trio.

Host Cat Deeley shared that last week's vote was the biggest of the season. The judges know the results and will base their elimination decisions on the Top Six performances.

Top Six group number:

Choreographed by Christopher "Pharside" Jennings & Krystal "Phoenix" Meraz the opening group included the six finalists as well as six All-stars doing a contemporary piece to "Down" by District 78 featuring Alexandra Senior.

Duets

Solos

Top Four
The Top Four is the last night of the competition, and sees the continuation of the All-stars (AS) in the opening group number, and as duet partners. Next week's finale showcases the Top Ten in favorite performances from the season. Each finalist will perform: a solo; four duets, one with an AS, and one with each of the other finalists; and the opening number. The votes from this week will be combined with last week's to reveal the winner in the finale.

Top Four group number:

Choreographed by Mandy Moore the opening group included the finalists as well as AS doing a contemporary piece inspired by Cats, the movie based on the musical of the same name, premiering in December 2019; the performance used a medley inspired by the movie's music.

Duets

Solos

Ratings

U.S. Nielsen ratings

So You Think You Can Dance Live! 2019 tour 
In July 2019, the So You Think You Can Dance Live! 2019 tour was announced. The forty-stop tour starts October 12 in Atlantic City, New Jersey—covering the U.S., with two Canadian stops—and ends December 6, 2019, in Reno, Nevada.

The Top Ten contestants will be among the performers, which will also include two SYTYCD All-Stars: Lauren Froderman, season seven winner; and Cyrus "Glitch" Spencer, season nine finalist. The concert will feature some of the current season's most popular routines and also include original works created for the tour.

National Dance Day

The 10th anniversary of National Dance Day (September 21), an event started by SYTYCD creator and lead judge Nigel Lythgoe's American Dance Movement (formerly the Dizzy Feet Foundation) was announced for several weeks. The official routine choreography is by Matt Steffanina to “Electricity” by Dua Lipa.

See also
 Glossary of partner dance terms
 Glossary of dance moves
 List of So You Think You Can Dance finalists
 National Dance Day (September 21)

Notes

References

2019 American television seasons
Season 16